Riviera Radio is an English language FM radio station that broadcasts to Monaco, Nice, Cannes, Antibes, and St. Tropez on 106.3-106.5 MHz. The station is also available on the internet.

Chris Tarrant broadcast on the station in 1992.

References

External links 

Radio stations in France
Mass media in Monaco